Annie Wealthy Holland (1871 – January 6, 1934) was an educator and the state supervisor of Negro elementary schools and was the founder of the first Negro parent-teacher association in North Carolina.

Early life and education 

Annie Wealthy Holland was born in 1871 in Isle of Wight County, Va., next to the plantation her grandmother worked on as a slave. Holland's parents, John Daughtry and Margaret Hill named her after Annie Wealthy of the Wealthy plantation, who had set Holland's grandfather, Friday Daughtry, free. After finishing her studies at the Isle of Wight County School, Holland's grandfather sent her to Hampton Normal and Agricultural Institute so that she could receive a higher education. However, after one year of school, Holland's grandfather's health began to fail, and so he could no longer assist her.

Career 
After leaving school, Holland traveled to New York City, New York where she became held the job as a nurse for William Hill. But, after several months, her health began to fail, and she was forced to return home. While at home, she was asked to take charge of a school in her own county, and so she took an exam to receive her second grade certificate. After teaching for two years, Holland traveled back to New York City to complete a course in dressmaking. Holland then went on to teach for nine years, during which she earned her second grade certificate. In 1897, she became assistant principal of a school, and in 1905 became the principal. Following this job, in 1911 Holland became the teaching supervisor in North Carolina, where her job was to make sure that African American students in Gates Country received a well-rounded education. In 1914, she became a supervisor on the Jeanes Fund board, where she served as a consultant and assistant to teachers in the North Carolina area. Later, in 1920, Holland began organizing a negro parent teacher state association, and in 1928 held the first meeting in Raleigh, NC. The organization was meant to raise the standards of home life and bring home to give every child the highest level of spiritual, mental, physical, and moral education.

Death and legacy 
Holland passed away on January 6, 1934, at age 63 while addressing a group of teachers in Louisburg, North Carolina, and was later buried in Franklin, North Carolina. On the tenth anniversary of the founding of the North Carolina Negro parent teacher association, members planted a tree in her memory at Shaw University, and named it the “Annie W. Holland tree.”

References 

1871 births
1934 deaths
People from Isle of Wight County, Virginia
Educators from Virginia
American women educators